The discography of Bad Company consists of 12 studio albums, and 6 live albums. Additionally, they have released 29 singles and 6 music videos.

Although they were an English band, Bad Company had more success in the United States than in the United Kingdom. Four of their albums were certified Gold by the British Phonographic Industry, while another four other albums were certified Multi-Platinum by the Recording Industry Association of America. Bad Company's most successful album was their 1974 debut, Bad Company. It was a Number One album on the Billboard 200 and also made the Top 3 on the UK Albums Chart. This album featured their biggest hit, "Can't Get Enough", which is their only Top 5 single on the Billboard Hot 100 and their highest charting single on the UK Singles Chart, where it reached #15 in 1974.

Albums

Studio albums

Live albums

Compilation albums

Singles

Music videos

References

Discographies of British artists
Rock music group discographies